Vasanth & Co is a chain dealer of consumer electronics and home appliances in Tamil Nadu, India. The company was founded in 1978 and has 96 showrooms across towns in Tamil Nadu, Karnataka, Kerala, Maharashtra, Delhi and Puducherry. The company was founded and owned by the late H. Vasanthakumar.

Expansion 
The chain reported a turnover of ₹ 5 billion (100 million US dollars) in the year 2007, which had doubled by 2020.

Branches 

Vasanth & Co has 101 branches by the end of 2021. 

Tamil Nadu : Chennai(26), Red Hills, Avadi, Chengalpattu, Tiruvallur, Arakonam, Vellore(2),Arcot, Arani, Sholingur, Gudiyatham, Ambur, Tirupur, Hosur, Salem(3), Namakkal, Attur, Dharmapuri, Coimbatore(3), Erode, Tirupur, Palani, Pollachi, Gobichettipalayam, Sathyamangalam, Villupuram, Tindivanam, Cuddalore, Panruti, Virudhachalam, Kallakurichi, Trichy, Pattukottai, Pudukottai, Karaikudi, Tanjore, Kumbakonam(2), Mayiladuthurai, Thiruvarur, Ponnamaravathi, Thuraiyur, Karur, Jayankondam, Perambalur, Madurai(3), Dindigul, Batlagundu, Theni, Cumbum, Sivakasi, Melur, Aruppukkottai, Ramanathapuram(2), Palayamkottai, Sankarankoil, Valliyur, Thisayanvilai, Tuticorin, Kovilpatti(2), Nagercoil(2), Marthandam, Karungal, Panachamoodu. 

Other States :
Bengaluru, Puducherry

SAP implementation 
The company chose to implement the mySAP ERP in 50 of its showrooms.

Founder
The founder H. Vasanthakumar was born in 1950. He died on August 28, 2020, due to coronavirus.

See also 
Vasanth TV
H. Vasanthakumar

References

External links 
Vasanth & Co website
Stores in Chennai

Companies based in Chennai
Retail companies of India
Retail companies established in 1978
Indian companies established in 1978
1978 establishments in Tamil Nadu